Parliamentary elections were held in Norway in 1891. The result was a victory for the Liberal Party, which won 63 of the 114 seats in the Storting. The Conservative Party and the Moderate Liberal Party contested the elections in an alliance, although separate lists were used in some constituencies.

Results

References

General elections in Norway
19th-century elections in Norway
Norway
Parliamentary